Camarles is a municipality in the comarca of the Baix Ebre in Catalonia, Spain. It was created in 1978 from parts of the municipality of Tortosa. It is situated in the east of the comarca, near the head of the Ebre delta. The town is served by the N-340 road to Tortosa, which also connects it with the AP-7 autopista at either l'Aldea to the south or l'Ampolla to the north.

References

 Panareda Clopés, Josep Maria; Rios Calvet, Jaume; Rabella Vives, Josep Maria (1989). Guia de Catalunya, Barcelona: Caixa de Catalunya.  (Spanish).  (Catalan).

External links
Official website 
 Government data pages 

Municipalities in Baix Ebre
Populated places in Baix Ebre